Cristian Damián Amarilla (born 8 November 1993) is an Argentine professional footballer who plays as a centre-forward for Club Olimpo.

Club career
Amarilla began his career with Deportivo Español. He featured in Primera C Metropolitana from 2011, scoring five goals in forty-six fixtures up until 2013–14 when the club won promotion to Primera B Metropolitana. Nineteen goals followed in four campaigns in the second tier, which included a hat-trick over Deportivo Riestra in 2015 and ten goals in 2016–17. On 27 July 2017, Amarilla joined Chilean Primera División side Universidad de Concepción. He played twice in 2017, with both appearances coming in games with Unión Española. Amarilla was loaned to Primera B de Chile's Unión San Felipe.

After one goal, versus Deportes Melipilla, across eleven appearances in all competitions in early 2018 for Unión San Felipe, Amarilla returned to Universidad de Concepción who subsequently loaned the forward back out - to Platense of Argentina's Primera B Nacional in June 2018. He scored on his starting league debut in September during a 2–0 victory over Deportivo Morón. Amarilla went back to Argentina, permanently, with Estudiantes on 8 July 2019. He was on the move again in February 2020, as he signed with fellow Primera B Nacional team Brown. He made one appearance before departing in June.

On 22 November 2020, Amarilla returned to Chile, as he signed with Deportes Valdivia. At the end of March 2021, he moved back to his homeland and joined Club Olimpo.

International career
In December 2015, Amarilla received a U23 call-up from Julio Olarticoechea for the 2016 Sait Nagjee Trophy in India.

Career statistics
.

References

External links

1993 births
Living people
Sportspeople from Avellaneda
Argentine footballers
Association football forwards
Argentine expatriate footballers
Expatriate footballers in Chile
Argentine expatriate sportspeople in Chile
Primera C Metropolitana players
Primera B Metropolitana players
Chilean Primera División players
Primera B de Chile players
Primera Nacional players
Deportivo Español footballers
Universidad de Concepción footballers
Unión San Felipe footballers
Club Atlético Platense footballers
Estudiantes de Buenos Aires footballers
Club Atlético Brown footballers
Deportes Valdivia footballers
Club Olimpo footballers